The 1886 Northwestern Purple football team was an American football team that represented Northwestern University during the 1886 college football season. The Northwestern team played only one game, a 32–4 loss at Evanston to a team representing the Harvard School Athletic Club.  The loss to the Harvard School was only the fourth game played by a Northwestern football team, one game having been played in 1876 and two games having been played six years later in 1882.

Schedule

References

Northwestern
Northwestern Wildcats football seasons
College football winless seasons
Northwestern Purple football